Live in the U.K. is the first live album released by the band Helloween.  It was released in Japan as Keepers Live. In the United States, it was released as I Want Out – Live without the track "Rise and Fall", and with a shorter edit of the introduction.

All tracks recorded in Edinburgh Playhouse, Scotland, by Manor Mobile on 6 November 1988 except "I Want Out" recorded in Manchester Apollo, England, 7 November 1988.

This is Helloween's only official live album with Michael Kiske on vocals until the release of United Alive in Madrid in 2019. This is also the last album made with Kai Hansen until the release of the aforementioned United Alive in Madrid.

Album cover
For the first time, the "o" in the "Helloween" logo was not represented by a pumpkin. On I Want Out - Live, it was represented by a globe showing portions of Western Europe, Central Europe, and the British Isles.  On Live in the U.K. it is instead drawn as a pumpkin logo on a bass drum.

Track listing

* 4:17 on I Want Out – Live issue

# absent on I Want Out – Live issue

On Future World, Kiske briefly sings a part from All Shook Up from Elvis Presley.

Credits
Michael Kiske – vocals
Kai Hansen – guitar
Michael Weikath – guitar
Markus Grosskopf – bass guitar
Ingo Schwichtenberg – drums

Charts

Weekly charts

Year-end charts

References

External links

1989 live albums
Helloween albums
Noise Records live albums